The 1993–94 Football League Cup (known as the Coca-Cola Cup for sponsorship reasons) was the 34th Football League Cup, a knockout competition for England's top 92 football clubs.

Aston Villa won the competition, beating Manchester United 3–1 in the final.

First round
A total of 56 of the First, Second and Third Division clubs compete from the First Round. 22 teams from the Third Division, 24 teams from the Second Division, and 10 teams from the First Division (the 7 teams that placed 15th-21st in Division One from the previous season plus the 3 promoted sides from Division Two from the previous season). Each section is divided equally into a pot of seeded clubs and a pot of unseeded clubs. Clubs' rankings depend upon their finishing position in the 1992–93 season.

First leg

Second leg

Second round
A further 36 teams entered in the second round, joining the 28 qualifiers from the first round. The 36 teams were made up from the 22 current Premier League teams, plus the remaining 14 teams from Division One. First leg matches were played on 21 and 22 September, with the second leg matches being played on 5 and 6 October.

First leg

Second leg

Third round
Most matches in the third round were played on 26 and 27 October with 5 replays being played between 9 November and 10 November.

Ties

Replays

Fourth round
All fourth round matches were played between 30 November and 1 December with three replays being played between 14 and 15 December.

Ties

Replays

Fifth round
The three of the four quarter final matches were played between 11 and 12 January with one quarter final match being played on 26 January. Two replays were played on 26 January and 29 January respectively.

Ties

Replays

Semi-finals
The semi-final draw was made after the conclusion of the quarter finals. Unlike the other rounds, the semi-final ties were played over two legs, with each team playing one leg at home and one away. Manchester United's quest for a unique domestic treble continued as they defeated Sheffield Wednesday 1–0 in the first leg at Old Trafford before a fine 4–1 win at Hillsborough in the second. Tranmere Rovers boosted their hopes of a first ever major trophy by defeating Aston Villa 3–1 in the first leg of the other semi-final, but they then found themselves on the receiving end of a 3-1 Villa win and lost the shootout, meaning that Villa went through, though they were up against a Manchester United side who had topped the league virtually all season and were also chasing the FA Cup.

First leg

Second leg

4-4 on aggregate. Aston Villa won 5-4 on penalties.

Manchester United won 5–1 on aggregate.

Final

The 1994 League Cup Final was played on 27 March 1994 and was contested between Aston Villa and Manchester United at Wembley Stadium. Aston Villa won 3–1 and denied United a domestic treble, as they later won the 1993–94 FA Premier League and 1993–94 FA Cup.

References

General

Specific

EFL Cup seasons
1993–94 domestic association football cups
Lea
Cup